Ana Beatriz Silva Correia (born ) is a Brazilian female volleyball player, playing as a middle blocker. She was part of the Brazil women's national volleyball team.

She participated in the 2010 Women's Pan-American Volleyball Cup.

References

External links
http://www.scoresway.com/?sport=volleyball&page=player&id=3015

1992 births
Living people
Brazilian women's volleyball players
Place of birth missing (living people)
Middle blockers